Laurel Snyder is an American poet and writer of children's books, including novels and picture books. She has also edited a number of literary journals and is a commentator for NPR's All Things Considered.

Snyder was born in Baltimore, Maryland, and holds degrees from the University of Tennessee at Chattanooga and the Iowa Writers' Workshop at the University of Iowa. She lives in Atlanta, Georgia, with her husband and children.

Published books

Daphne and Jim: A choose-your-own-adventure biography in verse (Burnside Review Press, 2005)
 The Myth of the Simple Machines (No Tell Books, 2007)
 Inside the Slidy Diner  (Tricycle Press, 2008)
 Up and Down the Scratchy Mountains, or The Search for a Suitable Princess (Random House, 2008)
 Any Which Wall (Random House, 2009)
 Penny Dreadful (Random House, 2010)
 Baxter, the Pig Who Wanted to Be Kosher (Tricycle, 2010)
 Nosh, Schlep, Schluff: Babyiddish (Random House, 2011)
 Bigger Than a Bread Box (Random House, 2011)
 Good Night, laila tov (Random House, 2012)
 The Longest Night: A Passover Story (Schwartz & Wade, 2013)
 Seven Stories Up (Random House, 2014)
 Orphan Island (Walden Pond Press, Harper Collins Publishers, 2017) National Book Award Longlist
 Charlie & Mouse (Chronicle Books, 2017) - Winner of the 2018 Geisel Award

As editor
 Half/Life: Jew-ish Tales from Interfaith Homes (Soft Skull Press, 2006)

References

External links
 
 
 

1974 births
Living people
American children's writers
American fantasy writers
American online publication editors
Poets from Maryland
Poets from Georgia (U.S. state)
University of Iowa alumni
Writers from Baltimore
Writers from Atlanta
American women poets
American women children's writers
Women science fiction and fantasy writers
Novelists from Maryland
Novelists from Georgia (U.S. state)
21st-century American poets
21st-century American women writers